Kang Kyung-ok (born October 16, 1965) is a manhwa artist whose work "It's Two People" was adopted into the film Someone Behind You, she also has work published by Netcomics.

Works
 Narration in Seventeen (1991)
 Present Continuous (1991)
 Normal City (1993)
 In the Starlight (1996)
 It's Two People (1999)
 Seol Hui (2008)

References

1965 births
South Korean manhwa artists
South Korean manhwa writers
Living people
South Korean female comics artists
Female comics writers